Bungles is a series of four American black-and-white short silent comedy films produced by Louis Burstein for Jacksonville's Vim Comedy Company in 1916.  While the series featured Oliver Hardy, Marcel Perez acted in the leading role as Bungles.  Perez was also the director for the four films.  Elsie MacLeod was the only other credited actor in the series.

Titles
 Bungles' Rainy Day
 Bungles Enforces the Law
 Bungles' Elopement
 Bungles Lands a Job

Cast
 Marcel Perez - Bungles (as Fernandea Perez)
 Elsie MacLeod
 Oliver Hardy - (as Babe Hardy)

See also
 List of American films of 1916
 Oliver Hardy filmography

External links

1916 comedy films
1916 short films
American black-and-white films
Silent American comedy films
American film series
American silent short films
Comedy film series
American comedy short films
Short film series
1916 films
1910s American films